Jacob Harris was a first-class cricketer and sports coach from Karachi, Pakistan.

He was born in Karachi, when it was still part of British India. He studied at St Patrick's High School, Karachi. He played cricket as a right-hand batsman and a leg-break bowler. He played for the Sindh main first-class team from 1932/33 and 1938/39 and the Maharashtra main first-class team from 1936/37 and 1939/40.
Between 1932 and 1943 he played 25 first-class matches.
Between 1953 and 1957 he umpired six first-class matches as well.

He coached Wallis Mathias, Antao D'Souza, Khalid Wazir, Wasim Bari, Rashid Israr, all who became Test cricketers for Pakistan.

The undisputed fastest human in Pakistan John Permal attributed his success on the track to the support of his school coach Jacob Harris.

The Jacob Harris Shield Inter School Cricket Tournament was started in his honour in Karachi in 2009. Forty schools participated in the tournament.

References

Pakistani cricketers
Sindh cricketers
Maharashtra cricketers
Karachi cricketers
Pakistani Roman Catholics
Year of birth missing
Year of death missing
Pakistani schoolteachers
Cricketers from Karachi
St. Patrick's High School, Karachi alumni